Manantiales (Argentina) is a village and municipality in Catamarca Province in northwestern Argentina.

In the Spanish language in the Americas, a manantial means spring.

References

Populated places in Catamarca Province